World market can refer to any of the following:
Market (economics)
World economy
Cost Plus World Market, an American chain of specialty/import retail stores